Ghost Stories was an American pulp magazine that published 64 issues between 1926 and 1932. It was one of the earliest competitors to Weird Tales, the first magazine to specialize in the fantasy and occult fiction genre. It was a companion magazine to True Story and True Detective Stories, and focused almost entirely on stories about ghosts, many of which were written by staff writers but presented under pseudonyms as true confessions. These were often accompanied by faked photographs to make the stories appear more believable. Ghost Stories also had original and reprinted contributions, including works by Robert E. Howard, Carl Jacobi, and Frank Belknap Long. Among the reprints were Agatha Christie's "The Last Seance" (with the title "The Woman Who Stole a Ghost"), several stories by H.G. Wells, and Charles Dickens's "The Signal-Man". Initially successful, the magazine began to lose readers and in 1930 was sold to Harold Hersey. Hersey was unable to reverse the magazine's decline, and publication of Ghost Stories ceased in early 1932.

Publishing history and contents

Fantasy and occult fiction had often appeared in popular magazines prior to the twentieth century, but the first magazine to specialize in the genre, Weird Tales, did not appear until 1923. Ghost Stories, which was launched by Bernarr Macfadden in July 1926, is one of Weird Tales' earliest competitors. Macfadden also published true confession magazines such as True Story; Ghost Stories followed this format, with the contents mostly produced by the publisher's staff writers, and attributed in print to a first-person narrator. The magazine was initially printed on slick paper, which was sufficiently good quality to allow photographs to be used, and many of the stories had accompanying photographs purporting to be of their protagonists. These were replaced by line drawings when the magazine was switched to pulp paper in July 1928. Ghost Stories occasionally printed contributions from outside writers, including "The Apparition in the Prize Ring", by Robert E. Howard, under the pseudonym "John Taverel". Popular writers such as Frank Belknap Long, Hugh B. Cave, Victor Rousseau, Stuart Palmer, and Robert W. Sneddon all sold stories to Ghost Stories, though the quality suffered because of the limited scope the magazine's formula gave them. Carl Jacobi's first published story, "The Haunted Ring", appeared in the final issue.

In addition to original material, Ghost Stories ran many reprints, including well-known Victorian ghost stories such as "The Signalman" by Charles Dickens, and "The Open Door" by Mrs. Oliphant. Agatha Christie's "The Last Seance" appeared in the November 1926 issue, with the title "The Woman Who Stole a Ghost", and six stories by H.G. Wells were reprinted, including ghost stories such as "The Red Room" and stories with less obvious appeal to the readership of Ghost Stories, such as "Pollock and the Porroh Man". Arthur Conan Doyle's "The Captain of the Polestar" appeared in the April 1931 issue, and he also contributed a non-fiction piece, "Houdini's Last Escape", which appeared in March 1930.

Macfadden set up an arrangement with Walter Hutchinson, a U.K. publisher, to exchange suitable material with The Sovereign Magazine and Mystery-Story Magazine, two of Hutchinson's U.K. genre pulps, and many stories appeared on both sides of the Atlantic as a result.

The magazine was initially fairly successful, but sales soon began to fall. In March 1930 Harold Hersey bought the magazine from Macfadden and took over as editor, but he was unable to revive the magazine's fortunes. In 1931 the schedule slipped to bimonthly, and three issues later the magazine ceased publication. The final issue is dated December 1931/January 1932.

Bibliographic details

Ghost Stories was published by Bernarr Macfadden, under the imprint Constructive Publishing Co., of Dunellin, New Jersey, until the March 1930 issue, after which it was taken over by Good Story Magazine Co. of New York, which was run by Harold Hersey, who had earlier edited The Thrill Book. The editorial director of Constructive Publishing during MacFadden's ownership was Fulton Oursler; his assistants, Harry A. Keller, W. Adolphe Roberts, George Bond, Daniel Wheeler, and Arthur B. Howland, each (in that order) spent close to a year editing, though the dates of transition between them are not known. When Hersey took over, his assistant was Stuart Palmer.

The magazine began as a slick, in bedsheet format and switched to pulp layout with the July 1928 issue; it remained as a pulp until the end of its run with the exception of eight issues in large pulp format from April to December 1929. There are 64 issues, with six issues per volume, except for the last volume which included only four issues. The price was 25 cents throughout; it had 128 pages when pulp-sized, and 96 pages when a bedsheet and when it was a large pulp.

No anthologies have selected their contents solely from Ghost Stories, but two magazines have done so: True Twilight Tales and Prize Ghost Stories, both published by League Publications, a subsidiary of the company that owned the rights to the original stories, MacFadden-Bartell. Prize Ghost Stories published one issue, dated 1963, and True Twilight Tales published two, dated Fall 1963 and Spring 1964. Both magazines were in large pulp format, with 96 pages, priced at 50 cents. The first issue of True Twilight Tales was edited by Helen Gardiner, who probably also was the editor of Prize Ghost Stories; the second issue of True Twilight Tales was edited by John M. Williams. There may have been other issues of both titles, as neither are numbered.

Notes

References

Sources

External links

 Ghost Stories 8 issues archive.org/details/GhostStories

Fantasy fiction magazines
Pulp magazines
Magazines established in 1926
Magazines disestablished in 1932
Magazines published in New Jersey
Magazines published in New York (state)
Horror fiction magazines
Defunct magazines published in the United States
Ghost stories
1926 establishments in the United States
1932 disestablishments in the United States